Damias catarrhoa is a moth of the family Erebidae first described by Edward Meyrick in 1886. It is found in western Australia.

References

Damias
Moths described in 1886